Peter Joseph Jugis (born March 3, 1957) is an American prelate of the Roman Catholic Church who has been serving as the bishop of the Diocese of Charlotte in North Carolina since 2003.  Jugis succeeded Bishop William Curlin as bishop of the diocese and is seated at the Cathedral of St. Patrick in Charlotte, North Carolina.

Biography

Early life and education
Peter Jugis was born in Charlotte, North Carolina, on March 3, 1957, and baptized at St. Ann's Catholic Church in 1957 by then Father Michael J. Begley.  Jugis attended South Mecklenburg High School in Charlotte and graduated in 1975.

Jugis studied at the University of North Carolina at Charlotte, where he obtained a Bachelor of Business Administration degree in 1979. He studied for the priesthood at the Pontifical North American College in Rome from 1979 to 1984, and received a Bachelor of Sacred Theology degree from the Pontifical Gregorian University in 1982.

Ordination and ministry
On June 12, 1983, Jugis was ordained to the priesthood by Pope John Paul II in St. Peter's Basilica in Rome. He received a Licentiate of Canon Law from the Pontifical Gregorian University in 1984.  After returning to North Carolina, Jugis had the following pastoral assignments in parishes:

 Parochial vicar of St. Leo the Great Catholic in Winston-Salem 1984 to 1985
 Temporary administrator of Holy Infant in Reidsville for the summer, of 1985
 Parochial vicar of St. John Neumann in Charlotte 1985 to 1987

In 1985, Bishop John F. Donoghue appointed Jugis as a judge on the marriage tribunal. In 1987, Jugis began studying part time at the Catholic University of America in Washington, D.C. while serving as parochial vicar at Sacred Heart Parish in Salisbury, North Carolina.  In July 1991, he was appointed as judicial vicar of the diocese and parochial vicar at St. Leo the Great Catholic Parish.  Jugis received his Doctor of Canon Law degree from the Catholic University of America in 1993.

Jugis' next pastoral parish assignments were :

 Pastor of Holy Infant in Reidsville from 1993 to 1996
 Pastor of Queen of the Apostles in Belmont, North Carolina 1996 to 1997
 Administrator of Holy Spirit in Denver, North Carolina, 1998 to 1999
 Pastor of Our Lady of Lourdes in Monroe, North Carolina, from 1999 to 2003

Bishop of Charlotte
On August 1, 2003, John Paul II appointed Jugis as the fourth bishop of the Diocese of Charlotte.  On October 24, 2003, Jugis received his episcopal consecration at St. Matthew Church in Charlotte from Archbishop John Donoghue, with Bishop William Curlin and Bishop Francis Gossman serving as co-consecrators.

During the 2004 U.S. presidential election, Jugis said that politicians who support abortion rights for women should be denied communion unless they publicly recant their views. In 2009, he endorsed a bill opposing gay marriage. In 2013, the Survivors Network of those Abused by Priests criticized Jugis and Bishop Michael Burbidge for not warning families in their diocese about Raymond P. Melville, a former Catholic priest accused of sexual abuse in Maine and in Maryland, who had moved to North Carolina.

On April 23, 2015, Jugis prevented New Ways Ministry co-founder Sister Jeannine Gramick from speaking at St. Peter Catholic Church in Charlotte. A diocese spokesperson said the diocese cancelled her appearance because the Holy See said Grammick was opposed to Catholic teachings on human sexuality.

On August 17, 2018 Jugis made a statement regarding allegations of sexual misconduct against Church leaders after a grand jury report named 301 Catholic priests who abused children in Pennsylvania. He stated that investigations were going on in the Diocese of Charlotte and encouraged Catholics to pray for all victims of sexual abuse. On December 30, 2019, Jugis released a list of fourteen priests credibly accused of sexual abuse in the diocese since 1972. On July 1, 2020, Jugis announced that Patrick Hoare, newly-appointed pastor of St Matthew Paris in Charlotte, was barred from active ministry on the recommendation of the diocese’s independent Lay Review Board.  This stemmed from an allegation of sexual abuse in Pennsylvania in the 1990's.

Liturgy
In 2005, following the publication of the Missale Romanum, editio typica tertia, its subsequent English translation, the accompanying General Instruction of the Roman Missal, and the publication instruction Redemptionis Sacramentum, Jugis issued liturgical norms for Diocese of Charlotte. In 2006, he reminded his priests that if they chose to wash parishioners' feet during Holy Thursday services (the mandatum), the liturgical law (at that time) mandated that the ceremony was for men's feet only.

Jugis supports the celebration of mass according to the Traditional Latin Mass in his diocese, as has been explicitly permitted by the motu proprio Summorum Pontificum issued by Pope Benedict XVI in 2007. Jugis offers mass at his cathedral using the Benedictine altar arrangement (six candles and a crucifix placed prominently on the altar) and has been seen to offer Mass ad orientem or ad apsidum.

See also

 Catholic Church hierarchy
 Catholic Church in the United States
 Historical list of the Catholic bishops of the United States
 List of Catholic bishops of the United States
 Lists of patriarchs, archbishops, and bishops

References

External links
 Bishop Jugis
 Diocese of Charlotte

 

Living people
1957 births
People from Charlotte, North Carolina
Bishops in North Carolina
Roman Catholic Diocese of Charlotte
Roman Catholic bishops in North Carolina
University of North Carolina at Charlotte alumni
Catholic University of America alumni
Pontifical North American College alumni
21st-century Roman Catholic bishops in the United States